Montpier, also known as Nicholas Perkins House, is a two-and-a-half-story brick house built on a stone foundation during 1821–22.  It has a gable roof with twin brick chimneys at each gable end.  It was built with slave labor.  Its original style was Federal, but its facade was modified in the 1859s by addition of a Greek Revival two-tiered portico and a doorway with side lights, corner lights and transom.

It was built for Nicholas "Bigbee" Perkins (1779-1848), of a plantation family.  Perkins is notable as the man who recognized Aaron Burr and assisted in Burr's arrest for treason on February 18, 1807.

The house was listed on the National Register of Historic Places in 1982.

References

Houses on the National Register of Historic Places in Tennessee
Federal architecture in Tennessee
Greek Revival architecture in Tennessee
Houses completed in 1822
Houses in Franklin, Tennessee
National Register of Historic Places in Williamson County, Tennessee